Rud Majan (also Romanized as Rūd Ma‘jan; also known as Rāzmaghān, Rāzmgahān, and Zarmajān) is a village in Bayg Rural District, Bayg District, Torbat-e Heydarieh County, Razavi Khorasan Province, Iran. At the 2006 census, its population was 956, in 330 families.

References 

Populated places in Torbat-e Heydarieh County